Slip of the Tongue is the eighth studio album by the British band Whitesnake, released in 1989. The album peaked at number 10 on both the UK Album Chart and US Billboard 200. Three singles were released from the album: "Fool for Your Loving '89", "The Deeper the Love" and "Now You're Gone". All the singles hit the US Mainstream Rock Tracks Top 40, two of which, "The Deeper the Love" and "Fool for Your Loving" cracked the Top 5. Slip of the Tongue has sold over one million copies in the US, reaching platinum status.

"Fool for Your Loving" originally appeared on the album Ready an' Willing, but it was re-recorded for this album.

Songwriting and production

After the tour for the band's previous multi-platinum self-titled album, guitarist Vivian Campbell left the group due to musical differences. Even with Campbell's leaving, the writing process for a new Whitesnake album started at Lake Tahoe with singer David Coverdale and guitarist Adrian Vandenberg. Some material, including the title track, had already been written while on tour and some lyrics were finished by Coverdale in Bora Bora.

Adrian Vandenberg had planned to record for the album, but the worsening of an existing injury made it painful for him to play, requiring surgery.  For the recording, Coverdale chose ex-Frank Zappa and David Lee Roth guitarist Steve Vai. Coverdale was unfamiliar with Vai's work with Zappa or Roth, but had seen him in the 1986 film Crossroads, in which Vai had greatly impressed him. Adrian Vandenberg revealed in several interviews that he thinks Vai's flamboyant guitar playing was somewhat inappropriate, and that a more bluesy approach would have suited the album better.

Most of the backing vocals are by Tommy Funderburk and Mr. Mister lead singer Richard Page; Coverdale's friend and former Deep Purple bandmate Glenn Hughes contributed backing vocals to three songs. Once again, keyboardist Don Airey, along with session musicians Claude Gaudette and David Rosenthal, was brought in to do some keyboard parts, but just like with Hughes, much of his material didn't make the final cut of the album.

Release
The album was finally released in late 1989. It reached number 10 on the US Billboard 200 chart, going platinum. Adrian Vandenberg was credited as a major co-songwriter, while Steve Vai was credited with "fulfilling all guitar responsibilities" on the album, and appeared in all the band's music videos.

Slip Of The Tongue 20th Anniversary Deluxe Edition was released in May 2009 as a two disc remastered version with slightly modified running order and ten bonus tracks. There is also a single disc version with just the remastered, re-sequenced tracks and no bonus material.

A 30th Anniversary Edition box set was issued in October 2019, including a newly remastered version of the album as well as other recordings and videos.

Reception

The album was met with mixed reactions, with many saying the album's sound was too far from the original Whitesnake-sound. David Coverdale himself has also seen the album as one of the weakest in the band's catalogue, but has since found somewhat of an appreciation for it. He summed his feeling up by saying:

For a long time, I felt the album lacked a certain Whitesnake feel in the music, but, countless people thro' the years have assured me that they enjoyed and enjoy the album, nonetheless. So, now I happily accept it as a significant part of the Whitesnake catalogue and to be honest, I enjoy it more now than I did back then. It was an album plagued with challenges and obstacles for me, personally, from many avenues, but hey...nobody said being successful is supposed to be easy!

Metal Rules ranked the album #38 on their list of the Top 50 Glam Metal Albums.

Tour
The world tour for the album was the biggest the band had undertaken yet, and included their third appearance and second headlining of the famous Monsters of Rock festival. After the tour Coverdale folded the band and took a break from the music business until late 1991 when he started to work with Jimmy Page, which resulted in the 1993 album Coverdale•Page.

Track listings

Personnel
Whitesnake

David Coverdale – vocals
Steve Vai – guitar
Rudy Sarzo – bass
Tommy Aldridge – drums
Adrian Vandenberg – guitar (credited but not recorded)

Additional musicians

Don Airey, David Rosenthal, Claude Gaudette – keyboards
Glenn Hughes, Tommy Funderburk, Richard Page – backing vocals

Production

 Produced and engineered by Mike Clink and Keith Olsen
 Assisted by Noel Golden, Gordon Fordyce, Shay Baby and Allen Abrahamson
 Mixed at Record Plant Studios by Mike Clink and Keith Olsen
 Mastered by Greg Fulginiti at Artisan Sound Recorders
 Cover by Hugh Syme
 John Kalodner: A&R

Charts

Album

Singles

Certifications

References

External links
 Official site
 

1989 albums
Whitesnake albums
Albums produced by Keith Olsen
Albums produced by Mike Clink
Geffen Records albums
CBS Records albums
EMI Records albums
Glam metal albums
Sony Music albums